John Engelbert (born John Henrik Lars Engelbert, May 19, 1982) is a Swedish songwriter, singer and guitarist in the rock duo Johnossi. He was formerly a tour guitarist in Håkan Hellström's band.

Engelbert's guitar sound is based on running an acoustic guitar through effects pedals and electric guitar amplifiers.

References

1982 births
Living people
English-language singers from Sweden
21st-century Swedish singers